HMCS Donnacona is a Royal Canadian Navy reserve division located in Montreal, Quebec. Dubbed a stone frigate, HMCS Donnacona is a land-based naval establishment for training and recruitment primarily of part-time sailors for Canada's naval reserve.

Operations

HMCS Donnacona's personnel provide on-going augmentation to Royal Canadian Navy operations and exercises on ships and at shore establishments on a full- and part-time basis.

Domestically, HMCS Donnacona contributes assets in the form of personnel and equipment to aid to the civil power operations. In the past, these have included the 1990 Oka Crisis, the 1995 G7 summit in Halifax, Nova Scotia, the 1997 Red River flood, the 1998 Ice Storm, the 1998 crash of Swissair Flight 111, the 2010 Winter Olympics in Vancouver, British Columbia, and the 2011 floods on the Richelieu River in Quebec and throughout Manitoba.

Throughout the Cold War, HMCS Donnacona provided hundreds of trained augmentees in support of naval and joint operations, as well as to the Korean War and the First Gulf War. The unit also provided personnel to the Afghanistan war and subsequent training mission, and to numerous United Nations peacekeeping missions and NATO operations.

During the Second World War, HMCS Donnacona served as the Royal Canadian Navy's principal recruiting and initial training depot in what was then Canada's largest city, ultimately enrolling, instructing and temporarily housing many thousands of sailors throughout the war. During the war's demobilization phase, these sailors were formally discharged at the unit.

History

In 1923, the first company of the Royal Canadian Volunteer Naval Reserve was formed in Montreal. The unit was originally housed at 465 Sherbrooke West, a converted private residence, until 1935, and then at a Bell Canada building at 1057 Mountain Street until 1939.  In August 1939 the unit moved to 1046 Mountain Street - again another old Bell property, but a much more appropriate one with a pillared main entrance and space for an indoor drill deck.

In 1941 the units were merged again as HMCS Montreal and in 1943 this division was moved to 2055 Drummond Street (the building of the old Montreal Winter Club curling rink) and re-commissioned HMCS Donnacona.

In 1943, the new name of the Naval Reserve division was chosen to be used as the name of the ship featured in the film Corvette K-225, featuring Randolph Scott and Ella Raines.

In the summer of 2007, HMCS Donnacona was moved to a new purpose-built federal government facility at 3525 St-Jacques Street shared with the Royal Canadian Mounted Police (RCMP) and the Canada Border Services Agency.

In 2019, the Band of HMCS Donnacona was reinstated as one of six Naval Reserve Bands in Canada.

See also

Canadian Forces
Royal Canadian Navy
Stone Frigate

References

Canadian Forces Naval Reserve
Organizations based in Montreal
Canadian Forces bases in Quebec
Canadian Forces Navy bases in Canada
Military units and formations of Canada in World War II